Brachyaciura rufiventris is a species of tephritid or fruit flies in the genus Brachyaciura of the family Tephritidae.

Distribution
Sudan, Eritrea.

References

Tephritinae
Insects described in 1918
Taxa named by Mario Bezzi
Diptera of Africa